Isopogon sphaerocephalus, commonly known as drumstick isopogon or Lesueur isopogon, is a species of plant in the family Proteaceae and is endemic to the south-west of Western Australia. It is a shrub with linear to narrow egg-shaped leaves and spherical heads of hairy white to creamy yellow flowers.

Description
The flowers are arranged on the ends of branchlets in sessile, spherical heads  in diameter with hairy, egg-shaped involucral bracts at the base. Flowering occurs from July to January and the fruit is a hairy nut, fused with others in a conical to oblong head  in diameter.

Taxonomy
Isopogon sphaerocephalus was first formally described by botanist John Lindley in A sketch of the vegetation of the Swan River Colony in 1839.

In 2019, Barbara Lynette Rye described two subspecies of I. sphaerocephalus in the journal Nuytsia but the names have not been assessed by the Australian Plant Census as at November 2020:
 Isopogon sphaerocaphalus Lindl. subsp. sphaerocephalus, commonly known as "drumstick isopogon";
 Isopogon sphaerocaphalus subsp. lesueurensis Rye, commonly known as "Lesueur isopogon" has a longer pollen presenter, hairier branchlets and leaves and more crowded, broader leaves than the autonym.

The specific epithet (sphaerocephalus) means "spherical-headed", and lesueurensis refers to Mount Lesueur, where this subspecies occurs.

Distribution and habitat
Subspecies sphaerocephalus grows in Jarrah forest between Gidgegannup, the Scott River area and the Kent River in the Jarrah Forest, Mallee, Swan Coastal Plain and Warren biogeographic regions. Subspecies lesueurensis grows in shrubland on and near the sides and bases of hills in the Mount Lesueur area.

Conservation status
Both subspecies of I. sphaerocephalus are listed as "not threatened" by the Western Australian Government Department of Parks and Wildlife.

References

sphaerocephalus
Eudicots of Western Australia
Taxa named by John Lindley
Plants described in 1839